The Berlekamp–Massey algorithm is an algorithm that will find the shortest linear-feedback shift register (LFSR) for a given binary output sequence. The algorithm will also find the minimal polynomial of a linearly recurrent sequence in an arbitrary field.  The field requirement means that the Berlekamp–Massey algorithm requires all non-zero elements to have a multiplicative inverse.  Reeds and Sloane offer an extension to handle a ring.

Elwyn Berlekamp invented an algorithm for decoding Bose–Chaudhuri–Hocquenghem (BCH) codes. James Massey recognized its application to linear feedback shift registers and simplified the algorithm. Massey termed the algorithm the LFSR Synthesis Algorithm (Berlekamp Iterative Algorithm), but it is now known as the Berlekamp–Massey algorithm.

Description of algorithm
The Berlekamp–Massey algorithm is an alternative to the Reed–Solomon Peterson decoder for solving the set of linear equations. It can be summarized as finding the coefficients Λj of a polynomial Λ(x) so that for all positions i in an input stream S:

In the code examples below, C(x) is a potential instance of Λ(x). The error locator polynomial C(x) for L errors is defined as:

or reversed:

The goal of the algorithm is to determine the minimal degree L and C(x) which results in all syndromes

being equal to 0:

Algorithm:
C(x) is initialized to 1, L is the current number of assumed errors, and initialized to zero. N is the total number of syndromes. n is used as the main iterator and to index the syndromes from 0 to N−1. B(x) is a copy of the last C(x) since L was updated and initialized to 1. b is a copy of the last discrepancy d (explained below) since L was updated and initialized to 1. m is the number of iterations since L, B(x), and b were updated and initialized to 1.

Each iteration of the algorithm calculates a discrepancy d. At iteration k this would be:

If d is zero, the algorithm assumes that C(x) and L are correct for the moment, increments m, and continues.

If d is not zero, the algorithm adjusts C(x) so that a recalculation of d would be zero:

The xm term shifts B(x) so it follows the syndromes corresponding to b. If the previous update of L occurred on iteration j, then m = k − j, and a recalculated discrepancy would be:

This would change a recalculated discrepancy to:

The algorithm also needs to increase L (number of errors) as needed. If L equals the actual number of errors, then during the iteration process, the discrepancies will become zero before n becomes greater than or equal to 2L. Otherwise L is updated and algorithm will update B(x), b, increase L, and reset m = 1. The formula L = (n + 1 − L) limits L to the number of available syndromes used to calculate discrepancies, and also handles the case where L increases by more than 1.

Code sample

  polynomial(field K) s(x) = ... /* coeffs are s_j; output sequence as N-1 degree polynomial) */
  /* connection polynomial */
  polynomial(field K) C(x) = 1;  /* coeffs are c_j */
  polynomial(field K) B(x) = 1;
  int L = 0;
  int m = 1;
  field K b = 1;
  int n;

  /* steps 2. and 6. */
  for (n = 0; n < N; n++) {
      /* step 2. calculate discrepancy */
      field K d = s_n + \Sigma_{i=1}^L c_i * s_{n-i};

      if (d == 0) {
          /* step 3. discrepancy is zero; annihilation continues */
          m = m + 1;
      } else if (2 * L <= n) {
          /* step 5. */
          /* temporary copy of C(x) */
          polynomial(field K) T(x) = C(x);

          C(x) = C(x) - d b^{-1} x^m B(x);
          L = n + 1 - L;
          B(x) = T(x);
          b = d;
          m = 1;
      } else {
          /* step 4. */
          C(x) = C(x) - d b^{-1} x^m B(x);
          m = m + 1;
      }
  }
  return L;

In the case of binary GF(2) BCH code, the discrepancy d will be zero on all odd steps, so a check can be added to avoid calculating it.

/* ... */
  for (n = 0; n < N; n++) {
      /* if odd step number, discrepancy == 0, no need to calculate it */
      if ((n&1) != 0) {
          m = m + 1;
          continue;
      }
/* ... */

See also
 Reed–Solomon error correction
 Reeds–Sloane algorithm, an extension for sequences over integers mod n
 Nonlinear-feedback shift register (NLFSR)

References

External links
 
 Berlekamp–Massey algorithm at PlanetMath.
 
 GF(2) implementation in Mathematica
  Applet Berlekamp–Massey algorithm
 Online GF(2) Berlekamp-Massey calculator

Error detection and correction
Cryptanalytic algorithms
Articles with example code